Farnam is a village in Dawson County, Nebraska, United States. It is part of the Lexington, Nebraska Micropolitan Statistical Area. The population was 171 at the 2010 census.

History
Farnam was founded in 1886 when the Burlington and Missouri River Railroad was extended to that point. It was named for Henry Farnam, a railroad official.

Geography
Farnam is located at  (40.706293, -100.215411).

Demographics

2010 census
As of the census of 2010, there were 171 people, 74 households, and 48 families residing in the village. The racial makeup of the village was 91.8% White, 0.6% Native American, 3.5% Pacific Islander, 2.9% from other races, and 1.2% from two or more races. Hispanic or Latino of any race were 8.8% of the population.

There were 74 households, of which 24.3% had children under the age of 18 living with them, 55.4% were married couples living together, 8.1% had a female householder with no husband present, 1.4% had a male householder with no wife present, and 35.1% were non-families. 29.7% of all households were made up of individuals, and 13.5% had someone living alone who was 65 years of age or older. The average household size was 2.31 and the average family size was 2.81.

The median age in the village was 46.8 years. 22.8% of residents were under the age of 18; 7.6% were between the ages of 18 and 24; 15.8% were from 25 to 44; 31.6% were from 45 to 64; and 22.2% were 65 years of age or older. The gender makeup of the village was 47.4% male and 52.6% female.

2000 census
As of the census of 2000, there were 223 people, 95 households, and 64 families residing in the village. The population density was 332.0 people per square mile (128.5/km2). There were 107 housing units at an average density of 159.3 per square mile (61.7/km2). The racial makeup of the village was 97.31% White, 0.45% Native American, and 2.24% from two or more races. Hispanic or Latino of any race were 0.45% of the population.

There were 95 households, out of which 30.5% had children under the age of 18 living with them, 56.8% were married couples living together, 8.4% had a female householder with no husband present, and 32.6% were non-families. 31.6% of all households were made up of individuals, and 18.9% had someone living alone who was 65 years of age or older. The average household size was 2.35 and the average family size was 2.94.

In the village, the population was spread out, with 28.3% under the age of 18, 4.0% from 18 to 24, 22.0% from 25 to 44, 26.9% from 45 to 64, and 18.8% who were 65 years of age or older. The median age was 40 years. For every 100 females, there were 99.1 males. For every 100 females age 18 and over, there were 88.2 males.

As of 2000 the median income for a household in the village was $24,327, and the median income for a family was $30,455. Males had a median income of $23,438 versus $22,188 for females. The per capita income for the village was $11,959. About 9.4% of families and 9.4% of the population were below the poverty line, including none of those under the age of eighteen and 19.2% of those 65 or over.

References

External links
 www.farnamnebraska.us Village website
 Local history

Villages in Dawson County, Nebraska
Villages in Nebraska
Lexington Micropolitan Statistical Area